Dicranograptidae is an extinct family of graptolites.

Genera
List of genera from Maletz (2014):

Subfamily Dicranograptinae
†Aclistograptus Ge, 2002 in Mu et al. (2002)
†Amphigraptus Lapworth, 1873
†Cladograpsus Emmons, 1855
†Cladograpsus Carruthers, 1858
†Clematograptus Hopkinson, 1875 in Hopkinson & Lapworth (1875)
†Deflexigraptus Mu, 2002 in Mu et al. (2002)
†Dicaulograptus Rickards & Bulman, 1965
†Dicellograpsus Hopkinson, 1871
†Diceratograptus Mu, 1963
†Dicranograptus Hall, 1865
†Incumbograptus Ge, 2002 in Mu et al. (2002)
†Jiangxigraptus Yu & Fang, 1966
†Leptograptus Lapworth, 1873
†Ningxiagraptus Ge, 2002 in Mu et al. (2002)
†Pseudazygograptus Mu, Lee & Geh, 1960
†Syndyograptus Ruedemann, 1908
†Tangyagraptus Mu, 1963

Subfamily Nemagraptinae
†Coenograptus Hall, 1868
†Geitonograptus Obut & Zubtzov, 1964
†Helicograpsus Nicholson, 1868
†Nemagrapsus Emmons, 1855
†Ordosograptus Lin, 1980
†Pleurograpsus Nicholson, 1867
†Stephanograptus Geinitz, 1866

References

Graptolites
Prehistoric hemichordate families